Ruben Rubinyan (Armenian: Ռուբեն Ռուբինյան; born  8 March 1990) is an Armenian politician, Vice President of the National Assembly of Armenia and former head of its Standing Committee on Foreign Relations. He was appointed a special envoy from Armenia for normalization of Armenia-Turkey relations in December 2021, meeting his Turkish counterpart Serdar Kilic on January 14, 2022.

Personal life 
Ruben Rubinyan is the son of Karapet Rubinyan, the former Vice-President of the National Assembly of Armenia (1995-1998) and former member of the Pan-Armenian National Movement party executive committee (1991-1998).

After graduating from Faculty of International Relations of Yerevan State University in 2010, he did a Master's degree at University College London (UCL) in Politics and Security in 2011 and Master's degree in European Studies at Jagiellonian University in Poland in 2012.

References 

1990 births
Living people
Members of the National Assembly (Armenia)
Politicians from Yerevan